Volkan Okumak (born 10 August 1989) is a German footballer who plays as a left midfielder for TFF Third League club Yeni Mersin İdmanyurdu. He made his Süper Lig debut on 16 August 2013.

References

External links
 
 
 
 

1989 births
German people of Turkish descent
People from Kamen
Sportspeople from Arnsberg (region)
Footballers from North Rhine-Westphalia
Living people
German footballers
Turkish footballers
Association football forwards
Sportfreunde Siegen players
Bayer 04 Leverkusen II players
VfB Hüls players
SC Wiedenbrück 2000 players
Kayseri Erciyesspor footballers
Şanlıurfaspor footballers
Giresunspor footballers
Manisa FK footballers
Pendikspor footballers
Oberliga (football) players
Regionalliga players
Süper Lig players
TFF First League players
TFF Second League players
TFF Third League players